Mr. Clean (or Mr. Proper) is a brand name and mascot, owned by the American company Procter & Gamble, used for an all-purpose cleaner and later also for a melamine foam abrasive sponge.

The all-purpose cleaner was originally formulated by Linwood Burton, a marine ship cleaning businessman with accounts throughout the east coast of the United States.

Mr. Clean made his television commercial debut in 1958, initially portrayed in the live-action versions by character actor House Peters Jr.

International versions
The name "Clean" is usually translated in languages:
 Don Limpio, in Spain; originally Mr. Proper
 Maestro Limpio, in Mexico 
 Mastro Lindo, in Albania, Italy, and Malta
 Meister Proper, in Austria, Germany, and Switzerland
 Pan Proper, in Poland
 Mister Proper, in Bulgaria, Dutch-language provinces of Belgium, China, Croatia, Czech Republic, Greece, Hungary, Latvia, Lithuania, the Middle East, the Netherlands, Romania, Russia, Serbia, Slovakia, Sweden, and Ukraine
 M. Net, in French Canada
 Monsieur Propre, in French-language provinces of Belgium, France, Luxembourg, and Morocco
In the UK and Ireland, the product is sold under the brand name Flash; this is because a company exists that uses the "Mr. Clean" name. Furthermore, Flash does not use a mascot, unlike Mr. Clean. For many years Flash was advertised on UK television by Scottish actress Molly Weir, with the catchphrase "Flash cleans floors WITHOUT scratching". Since 2016, adverts for Flash have included parodies of the song Flash by Queen.

Mascot
The product's mascot is the character Mr. Clean. In 1957, Harry Barnhart conceived the idea and Ernest C. Allen in the art department at the advertising agency Tatham-Laird & Kudner in Chicago, Illinois drew Mr. Clean as a muscular, tanned, bald man who cleans things very well. 

According to Procter & Gamble, the original model for the image of Mr. Clean was a United States Navy sailor from the city of Pensacola, Florida, although some people may think he is a genie based on his earring, folded arms, and tendency to appear magically at the appropriate time. (One of the live-action commercials has a character directly refer to Mr. Clean as a genie). 

Hal Mason, the head animator at Cascade Studios in Hollywood, California modified the existing artwork in print-advertising to be more readily used for the television commercials written, produced, and directed by Thomas Scott Cadden. (Cadden also wrote the words and music for the original Mr. Clean jingle — see below.) The first actor to portray Mr. Clean in live action television commercials was House Peters Jr.

In a New York Times obituary for the original illustrator, Richard Black, the product Mr. Clean was referenced to as the "Genie in a bottle"

Mr. Clean has always smiled, except for a brief time in the "Mean Mr. Clean" series of ads when he was frowning because he hated dirt. Although Mr. Clean is the strong, silent type, he did speak once in a few television commercials where actor Mark Dana appeared playing Mr. Clean in a suit-and-tie in the mid-1960s.

Mr. Clean's first name, Veritably, originated from a 'Give Mr. Clean a First Name' promotion in 1962.

In 2005, Mr. Clean was shown in MasterCard's "Icons" commercial during Super Bowl XXXIX, which depicts advertising mascots having dinner together, where he is shown helping do the dishes, and receives some dirty ones from Charlie the Tuna.

Mr. Clean appeared on the September 2010 cover of Biz X Magazine.

Mr. Clean was redesigned by Chase Design Group.

On September 8, 2016, Procter & Gamble announced a contest to find the replacement Mr. Clean. The contest was introduced with a new 60-second spot with actor Kellan Lutz spoofing an audition reel for the Mr. Clean role that took place in August 2016 Los Angeles, California. In addition to casting sessions at 404 NYC in New York on September 7, 2016 and Envision Studios LA in Los Angeles on September 14, 2016, contestants could also submit videos to the contest web site. The contest winner would receive $20,000 in mid-October, and be featured in the 2017 limited edition Mr. Clean calendar.

Jingle
Mr. Clean's theme song, or jingle, has been around since the product's introduction, initially sung as a popular-music style duet between a man (Don Cherry) and a woman (Betty Bryan). Thomas Scott Cadden wrote the jingle at his home in Skokie, Illinois in the spring of 1957 while working for Tatham-Laird & Kudner Advertising Agency. The vocal and piano recording was made on a home tape recorder for presentation to the agency and later to Procter & Gamble. Procter & Gamble approved the jingle in the spring or summer of 1957. Thomas Scott Cadden produced the recording of the jingle at Universal Recorders in Chicago in the summer or fall of 1957. Bill Walker was the arranger and Don Cherry and Betty Bryan were the singers. In January or February 1958, Cadden produced and wrote the first pool of television commercials — nine one-minute commercials and four 20-second "lifts". Included was the original full 60-second jingle commercial and the 10-second jingle "tag" at the end of all the others. They were produced at Cascade Pictures in Hollywood, California. The first pool of commercials ran in August 1958 at WDTV/KDKA in Pittsburgh, Pennsylvania the year the product was introduced. The jingle is copyrighted under numbers EU 589219 & EU 599220. The jingle is also registered with ASCAP under title code 570098598 & 570006267.

In 2016, an updated reboot of the jingle was made for a television advertisement. It is the longest running advertising jingle used in television history.

Original lyrics by Thomas Scott Cadden:
Chorus:

Mr. Clean gets rid of dirt and grime and grease in just a minute!

Mr. Clean will clean your whole house and everything that's in it!

Verse 1:

Floors, doors, walls, halls, white sidewall tires, and old golf balls!

Sinks, stoves, bathtubs he'll do, he'll even help clean laundry too!

(Repeat Chorus)

Verse 2:

Can he clean a kitchen sink?

Quicker than a wink!

Can he clean a window sash?

Faster than a flash!

Can he clean a dirty mirror?

He'll make it bright & clearer!

Can he clean a diamond ring?

Mr. Clean cleans anything!

(Repeat Chorus)

Mr. Clean, Mr. Clean, Mr. Clean!

Reboot lyrics:
Mr. Clean gets tough on dirt and grime

And grease in just a minute

Mr. Clean will clean your whole house

And every room that's in it.

Floors, doors, walls, halls

He's so tough he cleans them all

Grimy tubs and tiles he'll do

so your bathroom looks clean as new!

Mr. Clean gets tough on stuck on stuff

cleans kitchens in a minute

Mr. Clean will clean your whole house

And every room that's in it.

Mr. Clean!

Mr. Clean!

Mr. Clean!

In the Philippines Mr. Clean has multiple jingles in 1980s, 1990s and 2000s titled "Kuskos Piga" (transl. Scrub Squeeze) then "Labadami Labanbango" performed by Sylvia La Torre (1984) and Nova Villa (1995) then "Labadami Labango Labalinis" by Ali Sotto and Manilyn Reynes in 1997 and 1998, respectively, and in 2009 "Walang Dagdag Fabcon, Walang Dagdag Gastos" (transl. No Extra Fabcon, No Extra Cost) performed by Sarah Geronimo she is the last endorser before replaced by Bonux in 2010.

Mr. Clean scenes competition
In 1998, Honda Motor Co. created an advertising campaign, including a television commercial, featuring Mr. Clean to represent Honda's clean running Accord along with other Honda products including lawnmowers, string trimmers, motorcycles, and marine engines.

In March 2007, Mr. Clean launched an online competition with YouTube that gave consumers the opportunity to create a commercial advertising the Mr. Clean Magic Eraser.

The competition ran through June 30, 2007. In September 2007, the $10,000 prize was awarded to the creator of the winning video "Here's to Stains".

References

External links

Mr Clean Multi Surfaces Liquid Ultimate Orange ingredient list

Products introduced in 1958
Advertising characters
Male characters in advertising
Cleaning product brands
Procter & Gamble brands
Corporate mascots
Sexuality in popular culture